E.mu (sometimes e.MU or e.mu) was a Japanese rock group, mostly known because of their music for the Kaikan Phrase anime series.

History
Their first single "Love Around" appeared in 2000 as the ending theme of 35-43 Kaikan Phrase episodes. In the same year they signed the contract with Unlimited Records. Soon after that e.MU released music album Force of Fifth (May 28, 2000) under Unlimited Records label. Later, they released several singles, such as "Faith", "Will", and thereafter disbanded.

Members
 Mizuki — vocals, joined Needless Lyrics (vocals)
 Daisuke — guitar, joined ACID (lead guitar) and then Needless Lyrics (guitar)
 Yukku — bass
 Takahiro — drums

See also 
Kaikan Phrase

Japanese rock music groups
Musical groups from Hokkaido